Geison is an architectural term, particularly relevant to ancient Greek and Roman buildings.

Geison may also refer to:

 Gerald L. Geison (1943-2001), American historian
 Geison Moura (born 1986), Brazilian football striker
 Geison (footballer) (Geison Rodrigues Marrote; born 1987), Brazilian football striker